The 8th Annual Interactive Achievement Awards is the 8th edition of the Interactive Achievement Awards, an annual awards event that honors the best games in the video game industry. It was also held as part of the Academy's 2005 D.I.C.E. Summit. It was hosted by Kurt Scholler and Cory Rouse, and featured presenters including Lorne Lanning, Tommy Tallarico, Ray Muzyka, Greg Zeschuk, Stan Lee, Sid Meier, Jack Tretton, and Doug Lowenstein.

Half-Life 2 received the most nominations and won the most awards, including Game of the Year. Vivendi Universal Games also won the most awards, while Nintendo and Sony Computer Entertainment received the most nominations.

Trip Hawkins also received the Academy of Interactive Arts & Sciences Hall of Fame Award.

Winners and Nominees
Winners are listed first, highlighted in boldface, and indicated with a double dagger.

Hall of Fame Award
 Trip Hawkins

Games with multiple nominations and awards

The following 34 games received multiple nominations:

The following five games received multiple awards:

Companies with multiple nominations

Companies that received multiple nominations as either a developer or a publisher.

Companies that received multiple awards as either a developer or a publisher.

External links

References

2005 awards
2005 awards in the United States
February 2005 events in the United States
2004 in video gaming
D.I.C.E. Award ceremonies